is a Japanese swimmer, who specialized in freestyle events. He represented his nation Japan at the 2008 Summer Olympics, and has won a gold medal as a member of the Japanese swimming team in the 800 m freestyle relay at the 2009 Summer Universiade in Belgrade, Serbia (7:11.54).

Mononobe competed as a member of the Japanese team in the 4 × 200 m freestyle relay at the 2008 Summer Olympics in Beijing. Despite missing out the individual spot in the 200 m freestyle, he managed to place third at the Olympic trials in Tokyo (1:49.04) to earn a selection on the relay team. Teaming with Hisato Matsumoto, Yoshihiro Okumura, and Sho Uchida in the final, Matsumoto swam the anchor leg to close the race with a split of 1:48.62, but the Japanese team had to settle for seventh place with 7:10.31.

References

External links
NBC 2008 Olympics profile

1985 births
Living people
Olympic swimmers of Japan
Swimmers at the 2008 Summer Olympics
Japanese male freestyle swimmers
Universiade medalists in swimming
People from Toyohashi
Universiade gold medalists for Japan
Medalists at the 2009 Summer Universiade
21st-century Japanese people